The Global Retirement Index (GRI) is an attempt to examine  the factors that drive retirement security and  to provide a comparison tool for best practice in retirement policy. It has been published since 2012 by the French company Natixis, which specialises in asset management.

Norway, Switzerland and Iceland are respectively the first, second and third placed countries. India ranks 43rd, which is the bottom rank; it is preceded by Greece and ranks also last among the BRIC economies.

Qualifying countries 
The countries on the list are from the following organisations:

 Economic Co-operation and Development (OECD)
 International Monetary Fund (IMF) advanced economies 
 BRIC countries (Brazil, Russia, India, China and South Africa)

Metrics 

The Global Retirement Index is a composite welfare index which combines at total of 18 target-oriented indicators which are grouped into four thematic categories to calculate the position on the index. The indicators are then used to create a percentage score; countries are ranked by the score.

The four categories cover four relevant considerations for welfare in old age are listed below, along with the indicators that fall under them:

Health
 Life expectancy
 Health expenditure per capita
 Insured health expenditure

Material wellbeing 
 Income equality
 Income per capita
 Unemployment

Quality of life/environment 
 Happiness
 Air quality
 Water and sanitation
 Biodiversity and habitat
 Environmental factors

Finances in retirement 
 Old-age dependency
  Bank nonperforming loans
 Inflation
 Interest rates
 Tax pressure
 Governance
 Government indebtedness

References 

International rankings
Retirement
Top lists
Economic indicators
Demographic economics
2012 establishments in France